Filippo Antonio Gualterio (24 March 1660 – 21 April 1728) was made a papal nuncio to France (1700–1706) and a cardinal of the Roman Catholic Church from 1706.

Life
Gualterio was born in Fermo.  Descended from the ancient Gualterio family of Orvieto related to Pope Innocent X, he was grand-nephew of Cardinal Carlo Gualterio and uncle of Cardinal Luigi Gualterio.

Born at Fermo, whose archdiocese was governed by his grand-uncle Carlo, he was the eldest of 17 children of Stanislao Gualterio, Gonfaloniere of Orvieto, and Anna Maria Cioli, noble of Todi. He received doctorates at the University of Fermo in philosophy, theology, and utroque iure, both canon and civil law. Beginning in 1685, when he was made Governor of San Severino, he served in various governorates of the Papal States until he was sent as Vice-legate to Avignon (1696–1700), where he carried himself so well he was made papal nuncio to the court of King Louis XIV of France in April 1700, in preparation for which he was made titular archbishop of Atena at the end of March. On 16 May 1700, he was consecrated bishop by François de Mailly, Archbishop of Arles. Another member of his family, Sebastiano Gualterio, had already served as nuncio to France in 1554. He was made Commander of the Order of the Holy Spirit. He was recalled to Rome to be created cardinal in the consistory of 17 May 1706 and sent as legate to Romagna, 25 June. During his nunciature he established ties with prominent members of the European nobility and, in particular, with the Duc of Saint-Simon, who often mentions him in the Memoirs. In recognition of the esteem he gained from King Louis XIV, he was named the commendatory abbot of the Abbey of Saint-Remy in Rheims (1710) and of the Abbey of Saint-Victor in Paris (1713 or 1714).

Gualterio was nominated Cardinal Protector of Scotland, as of 1706, and England, as of 1717, he was one of the closest advisers to the Stuart Pretender, James Stuart, the would-be James III of England, who conferred upon his brother Giovanni Battista the Jacobite title of Earl of Dundee.

In 1709 Gualterio was transferred to the Diocese of Todi, with the personal title of archbishop, later resigning the see in favour of his brother, Ludovico Anselmo Gualterio, 5 December 1714. He participated in the Papal conclave, 1721, which elected Pope Innocent XIII and in the conclave of 1724, which elected Pope Benedict XIII.

Founder of a monumental library, now part of the Accademia dei Lincei, and of a vast collection of art, which after his death was partly acquired by Hans Sloane and is now at the British Museum, Gualterio was elected an honorary member of the Académie des Inscriptions et Belles-Lettres (1715).

Gualterio's remains were transferred to the tomb of his family in the Cathedral of Orvieto. The Gualterio papers are conserved at the British Library.

References

1660 births
1724 deaths
People from Fermo
Apostolic Nuncios to France
18th-century Italian cardinals
Members of the Académie des Inscriptions et Belles-Lettres
Burials in Umbria